Classic Radio is the first classical music radio station in Kazakhstan.

Mission
The main objectives of Radio Classic are: 
 Meeting the cultural and aesthetic needs of listeners; 
 Providing free around the clock access to the best music created in the last few centuries; 
 Promotion of classical music; 
 Supporting local artists and composers; 
 Creating of original cultural, educational and musical and programs.

Broadcasts
 "Zerkalo" with Natalia Goryacheva (Monday to Friday at 12.00) 
 "Kinoblyuz" Oleg Boretskyi (Monday 20.00, repeat - Friday 20.00)
 «Jazz time» Noel Shayakhmetov (Sunday 20.00, repeat - Tuesday 19.00) 
 "Culturnaya Mosaica" with Jania Aubakirova (Wednesday 19.00, Saturday 19.00)

References

Kazakh language
Radio stations in Kazakhstan